The 1722 British general election elected members to serve in the House of Commons of the 6th Parliament of Great Britain.  This was the fifth such election since the merger of the Parliament of England and the Parliament of Scotland in 1707.  Thanks to the Septennial Act of 1715, which swept away the maximum three-year life of a parliament created by the Meeting of Parliament Act 1694, it followed some seven years after the previous election, that of 1715.

The election was fiercely fought, with contests taking place in more than half of the constituencies, which was unusual for the time.  Despite the level of public involvement, however, with the Whigs having consolidated their control over virtually every branch of government, Walpole's party commanded almost a monopoly of electoral patronage, and was therefore able to increase its majority in Parliament even as its popular support fell.

In the midst of the election, word came from France of a Jacobite plot aimed at an imminent coup d'état. Led by Francis Atterbury, Bishop of Rochester, Lord North and Grey, and other Tory opponents of Walpole, this was later known as the "Atterbury Plot".

Previously election results had broadly reflected the opinion of at least the minority of adult males who had the vote, although the system had always been subject to the influence of corruption and patronage. However, now that one-party government had been established, those influences could be used systematically to ensure the governing party's victory. This election set the pattern for much of the rest of the eighteenth century; as partisan feeling began to decline during the years of the Whig oligarchy, the rigging of elections became ever easier, so that British governments could almost always guarantee victory.

Summary of the constituencies
See 1796 British general election for details. The constituencies used were the same throughout the existence of the Parliament of Great Britain.

Dates of election
The general election was held between 19 March 1722 and 9 May 1722. At this period elections did not take place at the same time in every constituency. The returning officer in each county or parliamentary borough fixed the precise date (see hustings for details of the conduct of the elections).

Results

Seats summary

See also
List of MPs elected in the British general election, 1722
List of parliaments of Great Britain

References
 British Electoral Facts 1832–1999, compiled and edited by Colin Rallings and Michael Thrasher (Ashgate Publishing Ltd 2000). (For dates of elections before 1832, see the footnote to Table 5.02).

1722 in politics
General election
1722